Huang Tsing-tung is a Taiwanese politician. He was the Deputy Minister of the Atomic Energy Council of the Executive Yuan in 2007.

Education
Huang obtained his bachelor's and master's degree in nuclear engineering from National Tsing Hua University in 1975 and 1977, respectively, and doctoral degree in nuclear engineering from the Massachusetts Institute of Technology in the United States in 1987.

References

Political office-holders in the Republic of China on Taiwan
Living people
Academic staff of the National Tsing Hua University
1951 births